The Men's 60 metres event  at the 2011 European Athletics Indoor Championships was held at March 5–6 with the final being held on March 6 at 16:55 local time.

Records

Results

Heats
First 4 in each heat and 4 best performers advanced to the Semifinals.

Semifinals 
First 2 in each heat and 2 best performers advanced to the Final.

Final 
The final was held at 16:55.

References 

60 metres at the European Athletics Indoor Championships
2011 European Athletics Indoor Championships